David Michael Walsh (born 29 August 1963) is a former international speedway rider from England.

Speedway career 
Walsh reached the final of the British Speedway Championship on three occasions in 1995, 1996 and 1997. He rode in the top tier of British Speedway from 1983 to 2001, riding for various clubs.

References 

Living people
1963 births
British speedway riders
Berwick Bandits riders
Bradford Dukes riders
Coventry Bees riders
Cradley Heathens riders
Ellesmere Port Gunners riders
Glasgow Tigers riders
Hull Vikings riders
Middlesbrough Bears riders
Newcastle Diamonds riders
Sheffield Tigers riders
Stoke Potters riders